Ronald Singbush (December 17, 1896 – December 29, 1950) was a Canadian curler. He was the second of the 1928 and 1929 Brier Champion teams (skipped by Gordon Hudson), representing Manitoba.

References

Brier champions
1896 births
1950 deaths
Curlers from Winnipeg
Canadian male curlers